Catharina Stopia (died after 2 April 1657) was the first female diplomat in Sweden, and Sweden's first ambassador to Russia during her tenure in office 1632–1634.

Stopia's father was the city doctor of Riga, Zacharias Stopius. In 1620, she married , who was ennobled Liljenhagen and appointed as ambassador of Sweden to Russia in 1630. Stopia (as was still common in Sweden at the time, she would not have used the name of her spouse) accompanied him to his office in Moscow.

When Johan Möller died in 1632, Stopia was officially credited by the riksråd to continue with the work of her late spouse and fill the position of his office as ambassador. During her tenure, she successfully completed a negotiation regarding the trade relations between Sweden and Russia. However, she later experienced serious difficulties, and her estate was attacked and burnt down. In 1634, she was forced to flee to Sweden.

Stopia remarried the colonel lieutenant Christoffer Jagow in circa 1637. She is last mentioned on 2 April 1657.

See also
 Bartholda van Swieten, another contemporary female diplomat

References 

 Liljedahl, Otto Ragnar (1935). Sveriges första kvinnliga diplomat.: Egenten Johan Möllers maka Catharina Stopia.. ut: Personhistorisk tidskrift 1934.. Stockholm. Libris 2776256
 Gustaf Elgenstierna, Den introducerade svenska adelns ättartavlor. 1925-36.
 Johan Möller, urn:sbl:8668, Svenskt biografiskt lexikon (art av Stefan Östergren), hämtad 2015-02-06.

17th-century Swedish people
Swedish nobility
Ambassadors of Sweden to Russia
People of the Swedish Empire
17th-century Swedish women
Swedish women ambassadors
17th-century civil servants
17th-century diplomats